This is a list of Jamaican artists, either from Jamaica or associated with Jamaica, including sculptors, ceramists, painters, photographers and designers.

A
 Carl Abrahams (1911–2005)
Panteha Abareshi (born 1999)
 Pearl Alcock (1934–2006)
 Esther Anderson (born 1946)

B
 Lindsay Barrett (born 1941)
 Isaac Mendes Belisario (1795–1849)
 William Berryman (active 1808–1816)
 Jacqueline Bishop (living)
 Hope Brooks (born 1944)

C
 Margaret Chen (born 1951)
 Leonard Chin (born 1953)
 Walter Chin (living)
 Albert Chong (born 1958)
 Renée Cox (born 1960)
 Thomas Craskell (died 1790)

D
 John Dunkley (1891–1947)

E
 Gloria Escoffery (1923–2002)

F
 Fowokan (George Kelly; born 1943)
 Armet Francis (born 1945)
 Ania Freer

G
 Christopher González (1943–2008)
 Lorna Goodison (born 1947)

H
 Guy Harvey (born 1955)
 Ras Daniel Heartman (1942–1990)
 Albert Huie (1920–2010)

K
 Kofi Kayiga (born 1943)

L
 Maria LaYacona (1926–2019)
 Errol Lloyd (born 1943)

M
 Dave McKenzie (living)
 Tamara Natalie Madden (1975–2017)
 Edna Manley (1900–1987)
 Ronald Moody (1900–1984)
 Petrona Morrison (born 1954)

P
 Eugene Palmer (born 1955)
 Ebony Patterson (born 1981)
 Charlie Phillips (born 1944)
 David Pottinger (1911–2004)

R
 Roy Reid (1937–2009)
 Mallica Reynolds (1911–1989)
 Namba Roy (1910–1961)

S
 Kenneth Abendana Spencer (1929–2005)

V 

 Margaret Rose Vendryes (born 1955)

W
 Nari Ward (born 1963)
 Barrington Watson (1931–2016) 
 Basil Watson (born 1958)
 Osmond Watson (1934–2005)

See also
List of Jamaicans
Jamaican art

Jamaican
Jamaican artists
artists